William Atkinson may refer to:

Politicians
William Atkinson (British Columbia politician) (1868–1939), politician in British Columbia, Canada
William Yates Atkinson (1854–1899), Governor of Georgia, USA
William P. Atkinson (1901–1980), Wisconsin State Assemblyman
William Albert Atkinson (1876–1948), provincial politician from Alberta
Gordon Atkinson (Australian politician) (William Gordon Atkinson, 1941–1984), Australian farmer and politician
William D. Atkinson (1861–1945), Associate Justice of the Kansas Supreme Court

Sportsmen
Bill Atkinson (baseball) (born 1954), American baseball player
Bill Atkinson (footballer, born 1944) (1944–2013), English footballer
Bill Atkinson (Australian footballer) (1876–1966), Australian footballer
Will Atkinson (born 1988), English footballer

Writers
William Atkinson (translator) (died 1509), English translator
William Atkinson (poet) (1757–1846), English poet

Others
William Atkinson (architect) (1774/5–1839), English architect
William Atkinson (1811–1886), English architect, son of Peter Atkinson
William Stephen Atkinson (1820–1876), Indian lepidopterist
William Edwin Atkinson (1862–1926), Canadian Impressionist painter
William Walker Atkinson (1862–1932), occultist, American pioneer of the New Thought
Bill Atkinson (designer) (1916–1995), American architect, fashion designer and photographer
William Atkinson (teacher) (born 1950), head teacher at Phoenix High School, London
Bill Atkinson (born 1951), computer engineer
Will Atkinson (musician) (1908–2003), traditional musician from northern Northumberland
William Henry Atkinson (1923–2015), Canadian naval fighter ace
William Atkinson (translator) (died 1509), Canon of Windsor
William J. Atkinson (born 1950), scientist